Château-Arnoux-Saint-Auban is a commune in the department of Alpes-de-Haute-Provence in the region of Provence-Alpes-Côte d'Azur in southeastern France.

History
Château-Arnoux-Saint-Auban is on the Route Napoléon, the route taken by Napoléon in 1815 on his return from Elba.

Geography

Château-Arnoux-Saint-Auban is on the river Durance.

Population
Its inhabitants are referred to as Jarlandins.

Sights
Château-Arnoux-Saint-Auban has one of the French pacifist monuments to the dead, which reads: "war is a crime".

The airfield is "Le Centre National de Vol à Voile", the French national centre for the sport of gliding.

Education 
A campus of the École nationale de l'aviation civile is located in the commune.

See also
Communes of the Alpes-de-Haute-Provence department

References

Communes of Alpes-de-Haute-Provence
Alpes-de-Haute-Provence communes articles needing translation from French Wikipedia